Torsten Schmidt may refer to:

Torsten Schmidt (athlete) (born 1974), German discus thrower
Torsten Schmidt (cyclist) (born 1972), German cyclist
Torsten Schmidt (officer) (1899–1996), Swedish officer